John Horbury Hunt (1838 – December 30, 1904) was a Canadian-born Australian architect who worked in Sydney and rural New South Wales from 1863.

Life and career
Born in Saint John, New Brunswick, the son of a builder, Hunt was trained in Boston, Massachusetts but then migrated to Australia in 1863. He worked in Sydney with Edmund Blacket for seven years prior to pursuing his own practice. His output was extremely varied and included cathedrals, churches, chapels, houses, homesteads, stables and schools. Probably his first building designed in Australia was the Superintendent's Residence at the Prince of Wales Hospital, Randwick, designed in 1863. A few years later he designed the Catherine Hayes Hospital, which was also built at the Prince of Wales Hospital, with the design modified by Thomas Rowe. Hunt's other works include the Convent of the Sacred Heart, now Kincoppal-Rose Bay, School of the Sacred Heart, Sydney, in the Sydney suburb of Vaucluse; and Tivoli, now part of Kambala, in the suburb of Rose Bay. In Armidale, New South Wales, he designed St Peter's Anglican Cathedral and Booloominbah and Trevenna which are now both part of the University of New England.

Hunt's distinctive, radical architecture was considered to be twenty years in advance of his peers, some of it unequalled in the world at that time, and sowed the seeds of some aspects of modern architecture in Australia. It has been said that "Undoubtedly men such as Hunt... have, through their buildings and their ideas, stiffened the intellectual backbone of Australian architecture." He was instrumental in bringing the North American Shingle Style to Australia. The outstanding example of this style was Highlands, a two-storey home designed by Hunt and built for Alfred Hordern in 1891. Situated in Highlands Avenue, Wahroonga, Sydney, Highlands is listed on the Register of the National Estate. Another notable example is Pibrac, designed by Hunt for Frederick Ecclestone du Faur. Pibrac is also on the Register of the National Estate.

Hunt was ruined by the Depression of the 1890s. He died in Royal Prince Alfred Hospital, Camperdown, eleven days after admission suffering from Bright's disease (a kidney disease). His personal effects, recorded in the hospital Admission Book, consisted of a metal box, three gold rings, a silver pencil and a pair of spectacles. He was buried at South Head Cemetery, Vaucluse, Sydney (the story that he was buried in a tomb with his wife and pet pony is a popular myth).

He was close to destitute at the time of his death. His home, Cranbrook Cottage, had  been repossessed by the mortgagor; it was demolished in 1925 to make room for the widening of New South Head Road. The site of the cottage is marked by a small rock garden, named Horbury Hunt Place. Riversdale House in Burradoo, now part of Chevalier College, still survives and is thought to be similar in design to Cranbrook Cottage, having been commissioned by Henry Osborne around the same period (c1875).

Partial list of works
The following buildings designed either in part or in full by Hunt are listed on various national, state and local government heritage registers:

Gallery

See also

 Architecture of Australia 
 Francis Greenway
 Edmund Blacket 
 John H. Buckeridge

References

 John Horbury Hunt: Radical Architect 1838–1904, author: Peter Reynolds, Historic Houses Trust Of New Sou, 2008. Paperback.
 Architect Extraordinary – the Life and Work of John Horbury Hunt: 1838–1904, author: J. M. Freeland, Cassell, Melbourne, 1970. Hard Cover.

External links

 Historic Houses Trust of NSW – John Horbury Hunt – Radical Architect
 St Peter's Cathedral, Armidale – History
 Australian Dictionary of Biography
 Booloominbah and other buildings

1838 births
1904 deaths
New South Wales architects
Federation architects
Australian ecclesiastical architects
Australian people of Canadian descent
Canadian architects